Primorsky Krai gubernatorial election, 2018 may refer to:

 September 2018 Primorsky Krai gubernatorial election, election, the results of which were canceled
 December 2018 Primorsky Krai gubernatorial election, recall election